Ctenobrycon is a genus of fish of the family Characidae found in tropical South America,  with five currently recognized species in this genus.
 
Ctenobrycon species can be located is fresh water in tropical climates in South America, commonly in calm waters. 
Their diet includes zooplankton, plants, worms, insects, and crustaceans.

An adult female can produce an average of 2,000 eggs. The fry hatch about 50 to 70 hours later, and after the third day look for food.

Species
 Ctenobrycon alleni (C. H. Eigenmann & McAtee, 1907)
 Ctenobrycon hauxwellianus (Cope, 1870)
 Ctenobrycon multiradiatus (Steindachner, 1876)
 Ctenobrycon oliverai Benine, G. A. M. Lopes & Ron, 2010
 Ctenobrycon spilurus (Valenciennes, 1850) (silver tetra)

References

Characidae
Taxa named by Carl H. Eigenmann
Fish of South America